The Ursa Major Moving Group, also known as Collinder 285 and the Ursa Major association, is the closest stellar moving group – a set of stars with common velocities in space and thought to have a common origin in space and time. In the case of the Ursa Major group, all the stars formed about 300 million years ago. Its core is located roughly 80 light years away and part of the Local Bubble. It is rich in bright stars including most of the stars of the Big Dipper.

Discovery and constituents
All stars in the Ursa Major Moving Group are moving in roughly the same direction at similar velocities, and also have similar chemical compositions and estimated ages. This evidence suggests to astronomers that the stars in the group share a common origin.

Based on the numbers of its constituent stars, the Ursa Major Moving Group is believed to have once been an open cluster, having formed from a protostellar nebula approximately 500 million years ago. Since then, the sparse group has scattered over a region about 30 by 18 light-years, whose center is currently about 80 light-years away, making it the closest cluster-like object to Earth.

The Ursa Major Moving Group was discovered in 1869 by Richard A. Proctor, who noticed that, except for Dubhe and Alkaid (Eta Ursae Majoris), the stars of the Big Dipper asterism all have proper motions heading towards a common point in Sagittarius.  Thus, the Big Dipper, unlike most constellations or asterisms, is largely composed of related stars.

Some of the brighter stream members include Alpha Coronae Borealis (α CrB or Alphecca or Gemma), Beta Aurigae (β Aur), Delta Aquarii (δ Aqr), Gamma Leporis (γ Lep) and Beta Serpentis (β Ser). More bright and moderately bright stars which are currently believed to be members of the group are listed below.

Group members
Current criteria for membership in the moving group is based on the stars' motion in space.  This motion can be determined from the proper motions and parallax (or distance) to the stars and radial velocities. A study published in 2003 using data gathered by the Hipparcos satellite (1989–1993) greatly improved both the proper motion and parallax estimates of nearby bright stars, refining the study of this and other moving groups.

Based on their distances (measured with Hipparcos) and apparent magnitude, the absolute magnitude can be used to estimate the age of the stars.  The stars in the moving group appear to have a common age of about 500 million years.

Core stars
The core of the moving group consists of 14 stars, of which 13 are in the Ursa Major constellation and the other is in the neighboring constellation of Canes Venatici. The average apparent magnitude of all 14 core stars is approximately 4.42.  None of these stars are hotter than spectral class A, but stream stars may be more massive and hotter.

The following are members of the moving group closest to its center. These stars are all in Ursa Major except where indicated.

Stream stars
There is also a "stream" of stars which are likely members of the Ursa Major Moving Group, scattered more widely across the sky (from Cepheus to Triangulum Australe).

Non-members
The Big Dipper stars Dubhe (α UMa) and Alkaid (η UMa) are not members of the group, both being somewhat further away and moving in very different directions.

The bright, nearby star Sirius was long believed to be a member of the group, but may not be, according to research in 2003 by Jeremy King et al. at Clemson University. This research seems to indicate that it is too young to be a member, and is moving in the same direction as the group by mere coincidence.

The Solar System is in the outskirts of this stream, but is not a member, being about 15 times older. The Sun drifted in along its 250-million-year galactic orbit, and 40 million years ago was not near the Ursa Major group.

See also 

 List of nearby stellar associations and moving groups
 β Pictoris moving group
 AB Doradus moving group

References

External links
  University of Arizona website
  Ken Croswell's astronomy website.
LeDrew, Glenn (1998). "AstroNotes: The Ursa Major Moving Cluster". Retrieved 28 July 2005.
 Stellar kinematic groups, Superclusters, Moving Groups – D. Montes, UCM
  J.R.King et al. 2003 Astronomical Journal paper classifying group members based on Hipparcos data.

 
Moving groups
Ursa Major (constellation)